The inferential mood (abbreviated  or ) is used to report a nonwitnessed event without confirming it, but the same forms also function as admiratives in the Balkan languages (namely Albanian, Bulgarian, Macedonian and Turkish) in which they occur. The inferential mood is used in some languages such as Turkish to convey information about events which were not directly observed or were inferred by the speaker. When referring to Balkan languages, it is often called renarrative mood; when referring to Estonian, it is called oblique mood.

The inferential is usually impossible to be distinguishably translated into English. For instance, indicative Bulgarian той отиде (toy otide) and Turkish o gitti will be translated the same as inferential той отишъл (toy otishal) and o gitmiş—with the English indicative he went. Using the first pair, however, implies very strongly that the speaker either witnessed the event or is very sure that it took place. The second pair implies either that the speaker did not in fact witness it take place, that it occurred in the remote past or that there is considerable doubt as to whether it actually happened. If it were necessary to make the distinction, then the English constructions "he must have gone" or "he is said to have gone" would partly translate the inferential.

Renarrative in the Balkan languages
Writing on the typology of evidentiality in Balkan languages, Victor Friedman systematizes the facts in the following way:

Ibid., "Illustrative data (interlinear glossing is omitted to save space):
[...]
Ai qenka i pasur! (Albanian, nonconfirmative present)
Ku qenka mjeshtri? (Albanian, nonconfirmative present)
Тој бил богат! (Macedonian, nonconfirmative past)
Той щял да ме набие. (Bulgarian, doubtful future)
Каде бил мајсторот? (Macedonian, nonconfirmative past)
Ама вие сте били тук. (Bulgarian, nonconfirmative present)
O zenginmiş! (Turkish, nonconfirmative past)
Patron neredeymiş? (Turkish, nonconfirmative past)
He is rich! (The nonconfirmative refers to surprise in the discovery of a preexisting state.)
Where is the boss? (Surprise at the boss's absence; Albanian can have true present meaning, while Balkan Slavic and Turkish cannot.)

In Bulgarian, even though a state of affairs may be entirely undisputed by the speaker, he or she may choose to use the renarrative in order to present disagreement with the actions or opinion of the speaker:

Обиждаш го не за друго, ами защото бил богат
(You're insulting him for no other reason than for the fact that he's rich)
Grammatically, this could be seen as a way for the speaker to be demonstratively re-narrating the event (the insult) back to the listener in order for them to pause and consider their actions.

Present and future tenses also exist for such a mood in the above-mentioned languages, but, with the exception of the Albanian true nonconfirmative present illustrated above, these "nonconfirmatives, (from perfects), always have a past reference to either a real or a putative narrated event, speech event, or state of mind. They cannot be used with true nonpast reference." 

Do t'u hapka një universitet privat (Albanian: A private university will be opened — apparently, i.e. as reported by someone & to my surprise.)
Varacakmış (Turkish: He will be arriving — as told by someone)

True renarrative

Often, there is no doubt as to the veracity of the statement (for example, if it was on the news), but simply the fact that the speaker was not personally present at the event forces them to use this mood (such as the Turkish varacakmış, above, or the Bulgarian той отишъл). In this sense, the renarrative could be considered a realis mood.

News reports
News headlines (in Bulgaria and Turkey, at least) are rarely presented in this mood, but rather in the indicative preterite—even though in most cases the reporters clearly did not witness the events being reported.

The main body of the news report tends to use the renarrative correctly; but sometimes, again, it is intentionally avoided. This is especially so when sensitive or controversial subject matter is being dealt with. This is because, due to its ambiguity, the renarrative in such cases could be perceived as a passing of judgement or expression of doubt by the reporter, rather than as a simple renarration. In such cases, constructions with a directly-cited source reference such as "the minister said that + indicative" are preferred.

See also
 Balkan sprachbund
 Irrealis mood

References

Grammatical moods